Dr. John Wesson Ashford is an American psychiatrist and neuroscientist. Ashford's studies include Alzheimer's disease and its effects on human memory. Ashford is Chair of the Memory Screening Advisory Board of the Alzheimer's Foundation of America, and a senior editor of the Journal of Alzheimer's Disease. He also serves as a Director of the War Related Illness and Injury Study Center in the VA Palo Alto Health Care System, as well as the clinical professor of Psychiatry and Behavioral Sciences (affiliated) at Stanford University.

Early life and education

Ashford was born in San Francisco, California in 1948. He obtained his Bachelor of Arts degree at the University of California, Berkeley in 1970, and attended the University of California, Los Angeles (UCLA), where he obtained both MD in 1974 and Ph.D in 1984 in Neuroscience. He completed his Psychiatry Residency training in 1979 and had 2 years of post-doctoral training in the MHTP (Mental Health Training Program) at the UCLA Brain Research Institute.

References

External links
 
 Ashford's website on Alzheimer's disease

Living people
1948 births
American neuroscientists
Alzheimer's disease researchers
University of California, Berkeley alumni
David Geffen School of Medicine at UCLA alumni